Brannigan may refer to:

Brannigan

Films
 Brannigan (film), a 1975 film starring John Wayne

People
 Francis Brannigan (1918–2006), fire service construction educator
 Geraldine Brannigan, (1954–), Irish singer

Fictional characters
 Zapp Brannigan, a character in Futurama

Food
 Brannigans, a brand of crisps

Branigan

People
 Alan Branigan, Ivorian-born American soccer player
 Andy Branigan (1922–1995), Canadian ice-hockey player
 James Christopher Branigan (1910–1986), a member of the Garda Síochána (Irish Police Force)
 Laura Branigan (1952–2004), American singer
 Branigan (album), debut album by Branigan in 1982

Places
 Branigan Lake, a lake in California
 "Branigan", nickname of the Thomas Branigan Memorial Library

See also 
 Branagan